Westport Township is one of twelve townships in Dickinson County, Iowa, USA.  As of the 2000 census, its population was 143.

Geography

Extinct towns
 Hagerty at 
 Wallace at

Adjacent townships
 Excelsior Township (north)
 Lakeville Township (northeast)
 Okoboji Township (east)
 Summit Township, Clay County (southeast)
 Waterford Township, Clay County (south)
 Harrison Township, Osceola County (west)
 Allison Township, Osceola County (northwest)

Cemeteries
The township contains Westport Cemetery.

School districts
 Clay Central-Everly Community School District
 Harris-Lake Park Community School District
 Hartley-Melvin-Sanborn Community School District
 Okoboji Community School District

Political districts
 Iowa's 5th congressional district
 State House District 06
 State Senate District 03

References
 United States Census Bureau 2007 TIGER/Line Shapefiles
 United States Board on Geographic Names (GNIS)
 United States National Atlas

External links

 US-Counties.com
 City-Data.com

Townships in Dickinson County, Iowa
Townships in Iowa